Understanding America is a compilation album by Frank Zappa. It was compiled and mastered by Zappa before his death in 1993 and released posthumously in 2012. Despite being released after UMe/Zappa Records had issued most of the albums in remastered form, all of the tracks included are sourced from the original 1986-1992 digital masterings.

Track listing

Notes and references

External links 
 Official page for the album on the Zappa website
 Indepth look at what's really on this album

Compilation albums published posthumously
Frank Zappa compilation albums
2012 compilation albums
Zappa Records albums